Jadson Cristiano Silva de Morais, known as Jadson (born 5 November 1991) is a Brazilian professional footballer who currently plays for Chinese Super League club Shandong Taishan.

Club career
Jadson would play for Brazilian side America before joining Campeonato Carioca club Bonsucesso, where he made his debut for them in a league game on 31 January 2015 against Resende that ended in a 1-0 defeat. After a season he would join Portuguese second tier club Portimonense where he would integrate himself as a vital member within their team before going on to win the 2016–17 LigaPro division title and promotion to the top tier with them. 

His first season within the top tier of Portuguese would initially see him struggle to gain much playing time time, however the following season he would go on to establish himself as an integral member of the teams defence as he helped keep the club within the division. Unfortunately, Jadson would be part of the team that finished within the relegation zone at the end of the 2019–20 Primeira Liga season, however they were given a reprieve after Vitória de Setúbal failed to gain a licence for the next season and were administratively relegated to the third-tier Campeonato de Portugal.

Jadson would not remain within Portugal and returned to Brazil to join top tier club Vasco da Gama on loan. This would be followed by another loan period, where this time he went abroad to China to join second tier club Wuhan Three Towns on 26 February 2021. After only seven games, which saw Wuhan go on to take the lead in the division he would return to Portimonense who loaned him out to top tier Chinese club Shandong Taishan on 27 July 2021 for the remainder of the 2021 season. The move would see Jadson quickly go on to establish himself within the team and he would gain his first league title with the club when he was part of the team that won the 2021 Chinese Super League title. The following season would see his move made permanent and he would end up by him winning the 2022 Chinese FA Cup with them the next season.

Career statistics
.

Honours

Club
Portimonense
LigaPro: 2016–17

Wuhan Three Towns
China League One: 2021

Shandong Luneng
Chinese Super League: 2021
Chinese FA Cup: 2021, 2022.

References

External links
Jadson Morais at Worldfootball.net

1991 births
Footballers from Rio de Janeiro (city)
Living people
Brazilian footballers
Primeira Liga players
Liga Portugal 2 players
China League One players
Chinese Super League players
America Football Club (RJ) players
Bonsucesso Futebol Clube players
Portimonense S.C. players
CR Vasco da Gama players
Shandong Taishan F.C. players
Brazilian expatriate footballers
Brazilian expatriate sportspeople in Portugal
Expatriate footballers in Portugal
Brazilian expatriate sportspeople in China
Expatriate footballers in China
Association football defenders